2C-T-17 or 2,5-dimethoxy-4-(β-secbutylthio)phenethylamine is a psychedelic phenethylamine of the 2C family.  It was presumably first synthesized by Alexander Shulgin and reported in his book PiHKAL (Phenethylamines i Have Known And Loved).

Chemistry
2C-T-17 is the 2 carbon homologue of Aleph-17, which has never been synthesized.  The full chemical name is 2-[4-(2-butyl thio)-2,5-dimethoxy phenyl]ethanamine.  The drug has structural properties similar to drugs in the 2C-T series, with the most closely related compounds being 2C-T-7 and 2C-T-8.

General information
The dosage range of 2C-T-17 is typically 60-100 mg and its duration is approximately 10–15 hours according to Shulgin.  2C-T-17 has highly psychedelic effects on thinking, but produces few to no visuals.

Pharmacology
The mechanism that produces 2C-T-17's hallucinogenic and entheogenic effects has not been specifically established, however it is most likely to result from action as a 5-HT2A serotonin receptor agonist in the brain, a mechanism of action shared by all of the hallucinogenic tryptamines and phenethylamines for which the mechanism of action is known.

Dangers
The toxicity of 2C-T-17 is not well documented.  2C-T-17 is much less potent than 2C-T-7, but it may be expected that at very high doses it would display similar toxicity to that of other phenethylamines of the 2C-T family.

Legality
2C-T-17 is not illegal, but possession and sales of 2C-T-17 could be prosecuted under the Federal Analog Act because of its structural similarities to 2C-T-7.

Canada
As of October 31, 2016, 2C-T-17 is a controlled substance (Schedule III) in Canada.

United Kingdom
This substance is a Class A drug in the Drugs controlled by the UK Misuse of Drugs Act.

References

External links
 PiHKAL #48 2C-T-17
 2C-T-17 Entry in PiHKAL

2C (psychedelics)
Thioethers